Experimental Lecture is an English pornographic book published in 1878 by the pseudonym "Colonel Spanker" for the "Cosmopolitan Society of Bibliophiles", an imprint of Charles Carrington.  The Colonel and his circle have a house in Park Lane where genteel young ladies are kidnapped, humiliated, and flagellated.

Henry Spencer Ashbee describes it as "coldly cruel and unblushingly indecent"; Bloch describes it as "completely sadistic";  Simpson describes it as focussed on anti-female violence.

References

1878 books
British pornography
BDSM literature
Books about flagellation